"Millionen Lichter" is a song by Austrian recording artist Christina Stürmer. It was written by Tobias Röger and produced by Christian Neander and David Jürgens for her sixth studio album Ich hör auf mein Herz (2013).

Formats and track listings

Charts

Weekly charts

Certifications

References

External links
 

2013 singles
2013 songs
Christina Stürmer songs